The 2019 Fergana Challenger was a professional tennis tournament played on hard courts. It was the 20th edition of the tournament for men which was part of the 2019 ATP Challenger Tour, and the ninth edition of the event for women on the 2019 ITF Women's World Tennis Tour. It took place in Fergana, Uzbekistan, between 3–9 June (women) and 17–23 June (men).

Men's singles main draw entrants

Seeds 

 1 Rankings as of 10 June 2019.

Other entrants 
The following players received wildcards into the singles main draw:
  Olimjon Nabiev
  Saida'Lo Saidkarimov
  Shonigmatjon Shofayziyev
  Timur Sottimov
  Ibrokhimjon Urinov

The following players received entry into the singles main draw using their ITF World Tennis Ranking:
  Sanjar Fayziev
  Konstantin Kravchuk
  Karim-Mohamed Maamoun
  Ivan Nedelko
  Alexander Zhurbin

The following players received entry into the singles main draw as alternates:
  Anton Chekhov
  Sergey Fomin
  Vijay Sundar Prashanth

The following players received entry from the qualifying draw:
  Timur Khabibulin
  Alexey Zakharov

Women's singles main draw entrants

Seeds 

 1 Rankings as of 27 May 2019

Other entrants 
The following players received wildcards into the singles main draw:
  Yekaterina Dmitrichenko
  Milana Maslenkova
  Setora Normurodova
  Sarvinoz Saidhujaeva

The following players received entry into the singles main draw using their ITF World Tennis Ranking:
  Daria Kruzhkova
  Sadafmoh Tolibova
  Valeriya Yushchenko
  Marianna Zakarlyuk
  Anastasia Zakharova

The following players received entry from the qualifying draw:
  Isabella Bozicevic
  Dariya Detkovskaya
  Arina Folts
  Shakhnoza Khatamova
  Ksenia Kolesnikova
  Margarita Lazareva
  Ekaterina Nikiforova
  Sevil Yuldasheva

Champions

Men's singles 

  Emil Ruusuvuori def.  Roberto Cid Subervi 6–3, 6–2.

Women's singles 
  Kamilla Rakhimova def.  Valeriya Yushchenko, 6–1, 7–5

Men's doubles 

  Evan King /  Hunter Reese def.  Nikola Čačić /  Yang Tsung-hua 6–3, 5–7, [10–4].

Women's doubles 
  Nigina Abduraimova /  Berfu Cengiz def.  Isabella Bozicevic /  Ksenia Laskutova, 4–6, 6–1, [10–3]

References

External links 
 Official website

Fergana Challenger
Fergana Challenger
2019
2019 in Uzbekistani sport
June 2019 sports events in Asia